The Hanoverian tower, more commonly known as the Naze Tower, is situated at the start of the open area of the Naze. It was a navigational tower, constructed to assist ships on this otherwise fairly feature-less coast.  Visitors can climb the 111-step spiral staircase to the top of the  tower for a 360 degree view of the beach and countryside.  The Naze Tower features a museum with exhibits about the tower, the ecology and geology of the Naze, and the coastal erosion problem. The tower also features a private art gallery on six floors with changing exhibits several times a year, and a tea room.  The tower is privately owned.

History

The present tower was built in 1720–21 by Trinity House, and was intended to work in conjunction with Walton Hall Tower to guide vessels through the Goldmer Gap. Towers at Naze and at Walton Hall are marked on a map of 1673 by Richard Blome, which in turn was based on a map drawn up in the late 1500s. The present Naze Tower therefore replaced an earlier construction at a similar location. It was of particular benefit to ships using the nearby port of Harwich. Both the current Naze Tower and its predecessor had beacons or lamps lit at the top, providing an early form of lighthouse.

Over the years, the tower has had a variety of uses. In the eighteenth century it was a tea house, operated by the actress and aristocrats' mistress, Martha Reay. It was a lookout during the Napoleonic Wars and again during the Great War of 1914–18. In the Second World War it was used as a radar station, with its crenellations removed to accommodate a radar dish.

Naze Tower was given Grade II* listed status in 1984 by English Heritage. Since 1986, it has been in private ownership.

References

Museums in Essex
Grade II* listed buildings in Essex